Charles Bain (15 March 1913 – 8 April 2007) was a West Indian cricket umpire. He stood in one Test match, West Indies vs. Australia, in 1965.

See also
 List of Test cricket umpires

References

1913 births
2007 deaths
Trinidad and Tobago cricket umpires
West Indian Test cricket umpires
People from Arima